Mucius Scaevola before Lars Porsenna is a c.1618-1620 painting by Rubens and his pupil Antony van Dyck. It was painted for the Spanish royal court and remained in the royal collection in Madrid until the second half of the 18th century. It was then acquired by prince Kaunitz of Vienna and then in 1820 for the Esterhazy collection. It is now in the Museum of Fine Arts (Budapest). Its subject is drawn from Livy 2:12 and its account of Mucius Scaevola's bravery before Lars Porsenna after the former's failed attempt to assassinate the latter.

Initial oil sketches 

Initial oil sketches and drawings for the work date to before 1620 and are now in the Pushkin Museum and British Museum. These show that Rubens produced the overall composition, with van Dyck adding details and other elements and finishing the painting. 

The drawings now in the British Museum shows two men holding their nose at the smell of burning flesh, whereas van Dyck only included one, immediately behind Scaevola himself.

References

1618 paintings
1619 paintings
1620 paintings
Paintings by Anthony van Dyck
Paintings by Peter Paul Rubens
Paintings in the collection of the Museum of Fine Arts (Budapest)
History paintings